Tomrogersia is a genus of beetles in the family Cerambycidae, containing the following species:

 Tomrogersia acanthofemorata Fragoso, 1980
 Tomrogersia villiersi Monne & Monne, 2006

References

Acanthocinini